Tanghalang Pilipino (Philippine Theater) is the leading exponent of Philippine theater and the resident drama company of the Cultural Center of the Philippines since its organization in 1987. It has successfully presented hundreds of productions over more than 30 theater seasons, earning numerous awards and citations while generating one of the best attendance records among the CCP's resident companies.

Tanghalang Pilipino wishes to develop and train actors, playwrights, and designers with special emphasis in the production of original Filipino plays. By staging plays from the repertoire of Philippine past and plays in translation from other countries, TP hopes to bring to the experience of both artists and audience the best of Philippine and global theatre tradition. It looks forward to educating and awakening the cultural consciousness of the Filipino audiences through its regular performances and other related activities like workshops, symposia and interactions.

The Tanghalang Pilipino season runs from July to March. Off season, TP finalizes theater project proposals for a cause. In 2013, along with UNICEF and the AIDS Society, TP aimed to disseminate correct information about the human immunodeficiency virus (HIV) and acquired immune deficiency syndrome (AIDS). Using theater as a medium, an original play and workshops about HIV/AIDS were made available in Manila, Cebu and Davao.

In 2020, stage productions were prematurely closed due to the COVID-19 pandemic. TP launched a program billed as PansamanTANGHALAN (a portmanteau of Filipino words pansamantala and tanghalan that means 'temporary theater') on digital platforms such as Facebook, Twitter, YouTube, and Instagram. It is also a part of an ongoing online fundraising project called Open House for the benefit of the Performing Arts community, which has been dramatically hit by the pandemic.

Felix "Nonon"Padilla was TP's founding artistic director from 1987 to 2000, directing most of its plays. He was succeeded by Herbert Go, 2001-06; and Dennis Marasigan, 2006-08.  Its current Artistic Director is veteran actor-teacher Fernando “Tata Nanding” Josef.

References

External links 
 Tanghalang Pilipino official website

Theatre companies in the Philippines